The western crested guineafowl (Guttera verreauxi) is a member of the Numididae, the guineafowl bird family. It is found in open forest, woodland and forest-savanna mosaics. It was previously known as the crested guineafowl when the three species were lumped together. The eastern crested guineafowl is found from Guinea-Bissau to Cameroon, Kenya, Zambia, and Angola.

Subspecies
 G. v. sclateri (Reichenow, 1898) – Sclater's crested guineafowl – northwestern Cameroon
 G. v. verreauxi (Elliot, 1870) – Lindi crested guineafowl – Guinea-Bissau to western Kenya, Angola, and Zambia

References

western crested guineafowl
western crested guineafowl